Dana Tyrone Rohrabacher (born June 21, 1947) is a former American politician who served in the U.S. House of Representatives from 1989 to 2019. A Republican, he represented  for the last three terms of his House tenure.

Rohrabacher ran for re-election to Congress in 2018, losing to Democrat Harley Rouda. He was the longest-serving House incumbent to lose reelection in 2018. Rohrabacher has expressed strong pro-Russia and pro-Putin opinions, which have raised questions about his relationship with Vladimir Putin and the Russian government.

Early life, education, and early career
Rohrabacher was born on June 21, 1947, in Coronado, California, the son of Doris M. (née Haring) and Donald Tyler Rohrabacher. He attended elementary school locally, and during his college years, he lived in Sunset Beach. Rohrabacher graduated from Palos Verdes High School in Palos Verdes Estates, California, attended community college at Los Angeles Harbor College, and earned a bachelor's degree in history at California State University, Long Beach in 1969. He received his master's degree in American Studies at the University of Southern California.

While in graduate school and during the early 1970s, Rohrabacher had a side activity as a folk singer. He was also a writer for the Orange County Register. At this time he was considered a free-market anarchist and libertarian activist, following his previous membership in Young Americans for Freedom. Libertarian author Samuel Konkin recalled Rohrabacher as "a charismatic campus activist, radicalized by Robert LeFevre who provided him with small funding to travel the country with his instrument and folk songs from campus to campus, converting YAF chapters into Libertarian Alliances and SIL chapters."

Rohrabacher served as assistant press secretary to Ronald Reagan during his 1976 and 1980 presidential campaigns. Rohrabacher then worked as a speechwriter and special assistant to President Reagan from 1981 to 1988. During his tenure at the White House, Rohrabacher played a leading role in the formulation of the Reagan Doctrine.

U.S. House of Representatives

Elections
Rohrabacher left the Reagan administration in 1988 to pursue Dan Lungren's recently vacated House seat. With his friend Oliver North's  fundraising help, Rohrabacher won the Republican primary with a plurality of 35%. He won the general election with 64% of the vote. He twice experienced serious primary competition, in 1992 and 1998. After redistricting, he won a three-candidate primary election in 1992 with a plurality of 48%. In 1998, he won an open primary with 54% of the vote. In general elections, only one time, in 2008, did he receive less than 55% of the vote, until he was defeated.

2008 

In 2008, Rohrabacher defeated Democratic nominee Debbie Cook, mayor of Huntington Beach, 53–43%, the lowest winning percentage of Rohrabacher's career.

2010 

In 2010, Rohrabacher defeated Democratic nominee Ken Arnold 62–38%.

2012 

After redistricting, Rohrabacher announced in 2012 that he would run in the newly redrawn 48th Congressional district. He said "The new 48th District is a good fit and something that will enable me to serve my constituents and the country well." He won re-election in this Orange County district, with 61% of the vote.

2014 

Rohrabacher won reelection with 64% of the vote.

2016 

Rohrabacher won reelection with 58% of the vote.

2018 

In March 2018, CNN reported that Erik Prince, a former intern of Rohrabacher while he was freshman congressman in 1990 and very close ally of Rohrabacher, hosted a fundraiser at Prince's Virginia home with expected attendees including Oliver North on March 18, 2018. On October 12, 2018, the Los Angeles Times reported that the Congressional Leadership Fund, a Super PAC closely associated with House Speaker Paul Ryan, had passed over Rohrabacher in its initial round of broadcast television advertising across Southern California. Rohrabacher's campaign denied this, saying that CLF had spent "about $2.4 million and they have an additional $1 million in media buys scheduled" for Rohrabacher.

Democrat Harley Rouda was declared the winner on November 10, 2018.

Tenure

In 1990, Rohrabacher opposed the National Endowment of the Arts and joined Mel Hancock in demanding its abolition. In a February letter to other members of Congress, Rohrabacher sent a photograph by artist and AIDS activist David Wojnarowicz. In April, liberal constitutional rights group People for the American Way announced its intent to launch a newspaper advert campaign against Rohrabacher.

Western vice president of the organization Michael Hudson stated, "Americans overwhelmingly reject censorship of the arts and support the NEA. Rep. Rohrabacher has taken the leading role in the House calling for the abolishment of the NEA. If we are to win this battle, we must energize and mobilize the creative community here in Los Angeles." Rohrabacher welcomed the announcement, stating that his constituents "don't want federal dollars to go to sacrilegious or obscene art" and that it would help voters to understand the issue. Explaining his position, Rohrabacher stated that he did not believe "anyone should be prevented from seeing what they want to see or painting what they want to paint...on their own time and their own dime. But if you get a government subsidy, that's another question."

In October, the House passed a bill to reauthorize funds for the NEA with the directive that the organization could not fund obscene art. Rohrabacher introduced an amendment that would include specific guidelines on the kind of art projects that could not be funded, such as works that were sexually explicit or denigrated the American flag or religions, the amendment being rejected by a vote of 249-175. Rohrabacher stated his amendment was supposed to ensure that the federal government was "not subsidizing obscenity, child pornography, attacks on religion, desecration of the American flag or any other of the outrages we have seen in the past." By the time the House passed the bill, Rohrabacher had become known as " the House's most outspoken critic of the NEA".

Race quotas
In October 1991, Rohrabacher wrote a letter to the civil rights division of the Education Department after seven Filipino students complained to the media that they were denied admission to the University of California, San Diego (UCSD). Rohrabacher requested the department conduct a federal civil rights investigation on what seemed to be "a quota based upon race that illegally discriminates against Filipino-Americans and possibly applicants of other races". UCSD vice chancellor for undergraduate affairs Joseph Watson refused the letter, dismissing Rohrabacher as "wrong when he says that 40% of admissions are reserved for certain races". He stated that the school ranks all applicants using a grade-based formula. Watson charged Rohrabacher with fanning hysteria over discrimination: "The Rohrabacher approach is to play to public fears that something fishy is going on. We don't want anyone to feel we're not giving everyone a fair and equitable review that can stand up to any scrutiny."

Election fraud and conviction
Rohrabacher was charged with improper use of campaign contributions in the 1995 state assembly election for providing money from his campaign and giving it to his Campaign Manager, and future wife, Rhonda Carmony (R) in order to promote a decoy Democratic candidate, Laurie Campbell, to draw away votes from the primary Democratic candidate Linda Moulton-Patterson, who was running against Republican Candidate Scott Baugh. Rohrabacher was found guilty and fined $50,000. (1995)

Impeachment of Bill Clinton

In November 1997, Rohrabacher was one of eighteen Republicans in the House to co-sponsor a resolution by Bob Barr that sought to launch an impeachment inquiry against President Bill Clinton. The resolution did not specify any charges or allegations. This was an early effort to impeach Clinton, predating the eruption of the Clinton–Lewinsky scandal. The eruption of that scandal would ultimately lead to a more serious effort to impeach Clinton in 1998. On October 8, 1998, Rohrabacher voted in favor of legislation that was passed to open an impeachment inquiry. On December 19, 1998, Rohrabacher voted in favor of all four proposed articles of impeachment against Clinton (only two of which received the majority of votes needed to be adopted).

National Defense Bill
In 2011, Rohrabacher voted against the National Defense Authorization Act for Fiscal Year 2012.

Jack Wu embezzlement
In June 2015, Rohrabacher released a statement accusing former treasurer of his reelection committee, Jack Wu, of embezzling more than $170,000 from his campaign. Rohrabacher's attorney Charles H. Bell Jr. stated that the congressman had filed criminal charges against Wu with the Orange County district attorney and state attorney general.

2011 visit to Iraq
During a trip to Iraq in June 2011, he said that Iraq should pay back the US for all the money it had spent since the invasion, when it becomes a wealthy country. Rohrabacher also commented he would be holding a hearing with the Sub-Committee on Oversight and Investigations into whether Iraq committed "crimes against humanity" during an attack on Camp Ashraf in April 2011. The incident left 34 residents killed and over 300 wounded. The delegation was denied access to the camp by Iraqi government, citing their sovereignty. Rohrabacher's delegation was subsequently asked to leave the country.

Payment for 30-year-old screenplay
On November 4, 2005, the Los Angeles Times reported that Rohrabacher was paid $23,000 for a 30-year-old screen play he had written. At issue was whether the producer paid him for the screenplay or for introductions to congressional and federal officials. Rohrabacher said that the introductions were made in good faith, were nothing that was not done regularly for legitimate causes, and that the introductions had only become an issue because of Joseph Medawar's alleged misdeeds. In May 2006, Rohrabacher announced through his press secretary that he would return the $23,000. The decision was made public shortly before Medawar took responsibility in a United States District Court for bilking $3.4 million from about 50 investors.

2016 consideration for Secretary of State
Following the election of Donald Trump in 2016, Rohrabacher was on the shortlist for Secretary of State along with Mitt Romney and eventual pick Rex Tillerson.

Trump protesters turned away from office
In February 2017, Rohrabacher faced criticism for refusing to meet with constituents that showed up at his local Huntington Beach office. The constituents were upset with his support of President Donald Trump. Police were called to remove the constituents.

Committee assignments

 Committee on Foreign Affairs
 Subcommittee on the Middle East and South Asia
 Subcommittee on Oversight and Investigations (Chairman)
 Committee on Science, Space and Technology
 Subcommittee on Space and Aeronautics
 Subcommittee on Energy and Environment

Rohrabacher chaired the Space and Aeronautics Subcommittee of the House Science Committee from 1997 until January 2005; he received a two-year waiver to serve beyond the six-year term limit.

As a senior member of the International Relations Committee, Rohrabacher led the effort to deny Most Favored Nation trading status to the People's Republic of China, citing that nation's dismal human rights record and opposition to democracy. His subcommittee assignments were East Asia and Pacific, and Middle East and South Asia.

Caucus memberships
 Congressional Cannabis Caucus
 Congressional Human Rights Caucus
 United States Congressional International Conservation Caucus
 Congressional Taiwan Caucus
 Sportsmen's Caucus
 Freedom Caucus
 House Baltic Caucus

Foreign and security policy positions

Russia

Rohrabacher has expressed strong pro-Russia and pro-Putin opinions, which have raised questions about his relationship with Vladimir Putin and the Russian government.

Early in Rohrabacher's congressional career in 1990 or 1991, KGB agent and deputy mayor of Saint Petersburg Vladimir Putin and two other Russians entered Rohrabacher's congressional office in Washington D.C.. They subsequently became close friends according to Rohrabacher during a 2013 interview with KPCC.

Rohrabacher called the Russian banker Aleksandr Torshin, a Putin ally, "sort of the conservatives' favorite Russian".

On September 8, 2008, at a House of Representatives Foreign Affairs Committee meeting, Rohrabacher argued that the Georgians had initiated a recent military confrontation in the ongoing Russia–Georgia war.

In 2012, the FBI warned Rohrabacher that Rohrabacher's support for Russia's interests was allowing Russia to cultivate him for its purposes.

In February 2013, Rohrabacher gave a speech urging the right to self-determination for the Baloch people in Pakistan at an UNPO conference in London.

In April 2014, he tweeted that "If majority of people legally residing in Alaska want to be part of Russia then its OK with me." In February 2017, he responded to the April 2014 tweet by writing "We fought a war against slavery. With out that factor if majority in any state wants out, let them go."

In April 2016, Rohrabacher and a member of his staff, Paul Behrends, traveled to Russia and returned with Yuri Chaika's confidential talking points memo about incriminating information on Democratic donors which were later discussed in the Trump Tower meeting on June 9, 2016. The talking points paper used at the Trump Tower meeting in June by Natalia Veselnitskaya was very similar to the document Rohrabacher had obtained from Chaika in April and included some paragraphs verbatim.

It has been reported in multiple sources that Rohrabacher is known for his long-time friendship with Russia's Vladimir Putin and his defense of "the Russian point of view." On June 15, 2016, then-House Majority Leader Kevin McCarthy  told a group of Republicans, "There's two people I think Putin pays: Rohrabacher and Trump. Swear to God." Then-House Speaker Paul Ryan ended the conversation, saying "No leaks. This is how we know we're a real family here." The Republicans present were sworn to secrecy. Brendan Buck, counselor to Paul Ryan, initially denied these reports, but was then told The Washington Post had a recording. After the recording was leaked by the Post in May 2017, McCarthy said the comment was intended as a joke which had not worked.

It was not reported for another year that around that time, Rohrabacher had planned, in his capacity as chair of the Europe subcommittee, to hold a hearing on the Magnitsky Act, which bars certain Russian officials from entering the United States or holding any financial assets in American banks. At the hearing Bill Browder, the American-born investor who had lobbied for the act's passage after what he claims was the illegal appropriation of his hedge fund's assets and the subsequent murder of his Russian lawyer Sergei Magnitsky, was to testify. Rohrabacher planned to subject him to what was described as a "show trial", where in addition to questioning Browder closely and skeptically about his claims, a feature-length documentary film critical of the Magnitsky claims, directed by Andrei Nekrasov, was to be shown in its entirety. Among the other witnesses scheduled to testify were Russian lawyer Natalia Veselnitskaya, a longtime lobbyist against the Magnitsky Act; at around the same time, she had attended a meeting with Donald Trump Jr, Jared Kushner and Trump's then-campaign manager Paul Manafort at which the Russians purportedly offered to share negative information about Hillary Clinton, Trump's opponent in that year's election. In July 2017, Browder testified to the Senate Judiciary Committee that persons supporting the interests of foreign governments or acting on their behalf, especially Russia, must comply with Foreign Agents Registration Act (FARA) requirements and that no one behind the screening of the Andrei Nekrasov film had met the disclosure filings under FARA.

When Foreign Affairs Committee chairman Ed Royce learned of the plans, he canceled the hearing and forbade Rohrabacher from showing the film. In its stead, he held a full committee hearing on U.S.-Russia relations at which Rohrabacher was allowed to submit some of the pro-Russian claims into evidence. The film was ultimately shown at the Newseum, and an intern in Rohrabacher's office who later worked for the Trump transition team sent emails promoting the film from the subcommittee offices.

After Donald Trump won the 2016 presidential election, Rohrabacher defended his approach to improving Russian–American relations. He had previously met at least twice to discuss Russian sanctions with Rinat Akhmetshin, a former Soviet spy "who met with President Trump's son, son-in-law and campaign manager in June 2016".

In a May 2017 interview with CNN, Rohrabacher said, "We have a huge double standard with Russia when it comes to prisoners and other things," and further stated that interference by the Russian intelligence services' in the 2016 U.S. election was the same as the National Security Agency (NSA) bugging German Chancellor Angela Merkel's phone.

In July 2017, Rohrabacher voted for imposing new sanctions on Iran, North Korea, and Russia.

In February 2020, it was reported that in August 2017, Rohrabacher met with Julian Assange in the Ecuadorian Embassy in London to offer Assange a pardon from President Trump if Assange can offer material supporting Seth Rich as the source of email leaks from the Democratic National Committee during 2016 and not Russians.

In October 2017, the House Committee on Foreign Affairs placed restrictions on Rohrabacher's ability to use committee money to pay for foreign travel due to concerns over his interest in Russia.

In an interview with Fox Business Channel on August 24, 2018, Rohrabacher attacked Attorney General Jeff Sessions, because Sessions had refused to fire Robert Mueller and shut down the Russia collusion investigation. He said: "The fact that Jeff Sessions has not quit is a disloyalty to this president and to the country, the fact is, if he disagrees with what the president wants him to do, he should resign."

It was reported in February 2020 Rohrabacher told Yahoo News his goal during a meeting with Julian Assange was to find evidence for a widely debunked conspiracy theory that WikiLeaks' real source was not Russian intelligence agents for the DNC emails but former DNC staffer Seth Rich.  Stephanie Grisham, White House spokesperson for President Trump, stated that Trump barely knew Rohrabacher, except that he was an ex-congressman, and has not spoken with Rohrabacher "on this subject or almost any subject". On February 19, 2020, Edward Fitzgerald, Julian Assange's barrister, asserted at Westminster Magistrates' Court in London that Rohrabacher had been sent on behalf of President Trump in August 2017 to offer Assange a pardon from Trump if Assange could release material to show that Russian intelligence were not involved in the 2016 United States election interference.

Terrorism
In 2006, Rohrabacher chaired the Subcommittee on Oversight and Investigations of the U.S. House Committee on International Relations, which investigated whether the Oklahoma City bombers had assistance from foreign sources; the committee determined there was no conclusive evidence of a foreign connection. In the 113th Congress, Rohrabacher was chair of the House Foreign Affairs Subcommittee on Europe, Eurasia and Emerging Threats.

Speaking about Islam, he said during a hearing in April 2013, "I hope we all work together against a religion that will motivate people to murder children and other threats to us as a civilization."

In the wake of the 2016 Orlando nightclub shooting, Rohrabacher put out a press release stating that he felt "outrage" and a "renewed commitment to defeat and destroy the radical Islamic movement that fosters such mayhem." He stressed that Americans must "be sure not to label all Muslims as terrorist murderers." Rohrabacher met Seddique Mateen, the father of the shooter, in 2014 during routine meetings with constituents. He called Mateen an "estranged individual."

In a statement to clarify his position, Rohrabacher wrote that he opposes "the use of force against unarmed civilians no matter who is the victim or who is doing the killing" but he is also against "Iran's vicious Mullah monarchy" and "when it comes to Sunni terrorists or Shiite terrorists, I prefer them to target each other rather than any other victims, especially innocent civilians and Americans." He added that it will "require support for those proud Iranians who want to win their freedom and heritage from Mullahs and are willing to fight for it. That does not include Isis, but it may include a lot of Iranians who see blowing up Khomeini's mausoleum as an expression of freedom from the yolk [sic] of Islamic terror."

Defense of interrogation techniques and extraordinary rendition
On April 17, 2007, during a House hearing on trans-Atlantic relations, Rohrabacher defended the Bush administration's program of extraordinary rendition. He said that the unfair treatment of one innocent suspect is an acceptable "unfortunate consequence" of holding others who would otherwise be free to commit terror acts. After he received boos and groans from the gallery, Rohrabacher responded, "Well, I hope it's your families, I hope it's your families that suffer the consequences," and "I hope it's your family members that die." Rohrabacher was subsequently interrupted by protesters wearing orange jumpsuits who were removed from the gallery. For his comment that imprisoning and torturing one innocent person was a fair price to pay for locking up 50 terrorists who would "go out and plant a bomb and kill 20,000 people", on April 25 Rohrabacher was named Countdown with Keith Olbermann's "Worst Person in the World".

Afghanistan
Rohrabacher's interest in Afghanistan extends back at least to the late 1980s, before his time in office, when he entered the country in the company of mujahideen fighters who were fighting Soviet occupation forces. Reportedly, these fighters "actually engaged Soviet troops in combat near the city of Jalalabad during the two months Rohrabacher was with them." In the years after the Soviet–Afghan War (1979–1989), Rohrabacher said his "passion" was to bring back the country's exiled king, Muhammad Zahir Shah.

In 2003, Rohrabacher defended the new Afghan constitution against those who saw in it mainly empowerment of warlords, saying:

Rohrabacher has since become a proponent of withdrawing from Afghanistan. He protested against the troop build-up in Afghanistan by President Obama, saying "If the Taliban is going is be defeated, it's got to be by the Afghan people themselves, not by sending more U.S. troops, which could actually be counterproductive." When Congressman Jim McGovern offered an amendment in 2011 requiring the Pentagon to draw up an exit plan from Afghanistan, Rohrabacher was just one of six Republicans to sign on. Rohrabacher voted for McGovern's Amendment to the National Defense Authorization Act, requiring an exit plan from Afghanistan. The bill failed by a 204–215 margin.

Rohrabacher was against former President Obama's gradual drawdown of troops, instead supporting a full withdrawal. Saying "If we're going to leave, we should leave." Rohrabacher has said that "The centralized system of government foisted upon the Afghan people is not going to hold after we leave." And "So let's quit prolonging the agony and inevitable. Karzai's regime is corrupt and non representative of Afghanistan's tribal culture. This failed strategy is not worth one more drop of American blood. Under the current strategy, our military presence alienates more Afghans that it pacifies. So if you're going to pull the plug, then we need to get the hell out now." Rohrabacher has repeatedly raised high-level concerns in the US Congress and Washington, D.C., about the significant corruption in Afghanistan, including the Kabul Bank scandal, where hundreds of millions of U.S. taxpayers' dollars allegedly disappeared in a short period of time at the apparent hands of close Karzai family members, including brothers Mahmoud Karzai (a.k.a. Mahmood Karzai) and Ahmed Wali Karzai. Rohrabacher worked to bring attention to the systemic corruption in the Karzai government and cut U.S. taxpayers' funding for these wasteful projects and programs, involving corruption within the Hamid Karzai government.

In April 2012, CNN reported that "A top Republican on the House Foreign Affairs committee was asked by the State Department not to go to Afghanistan because President Hamid Karzai objected to the visit. ... Dana Rohrabacher, R-California, told Security Clearance he was readying to travel with five other Republicans from Dubai to Afghanistan's capital, Kabul, when the State Department requested he stay behind."

Bosnia and Kosovo independence

Rohrabacher was opposed to the involvement of American ground troops in the Yugoslav Wars. He advocated for the direct bombing of the military on Yugoslav soil, criticizing the ineffectiveness of western forces against the Bosnian Serbs. (NATO was limited to small fixed attacks, as these Serbs penetrated UN safe areas and attacked Bosniak forces.) Rohrabacher said they "should bomb Serbia's military infrastructure, in Serbia – get that, in Serbia – rather than dropping a couple of duds on tents, which only proves the West's gutlessness, and emboldens Serbian cutthroats." Rohrabacher considered the events in Bosnia to constitute genocide. In 1995, Rohrabacher personally visited Sarajevo in Bosnia, criticizing the devastation Serb forces inflicted on the city, saying "This is a loss to all mankind, not just to the people of Sarajevo." He also encountered vagabond children asking for money.

In 2001, the leader of the Albanian American Civic League ethnic lobby group, Joseph J. DioGuardi, praised Rohrabacher for his support to the Kosovo Liberation Army (KLA), a militia that was once labeled by Bill Clinton's special envoy to the Balkans Robert Gelbard as a terrorist organization, saying "He was the first member of Congress to insist that the United States arm the Kosova Liberation Army, and one of the few members who to this day publicly supports the independence of Kosova." Also in 2001, Rohrabacher gave a speech in support of American equipping the KLA with weaponry, comparing it to French support of America in the Revolutionary War, saying "Based on our own experience, the Kosova Liberation Army should have been armed. ... If the U.S. had armed the KLA in 1998, we would not be where we are today. The 'freedom fighters' would have secured their freedom and Kosova would be independent."

China 
After a reconnaissance flight over the Spratly Islands in 1998, Rohrabacher said, "We can't ignore this bullying by the Communist Chinese in the Spratlys. The presence of the Chinese military troops...is not only a concern of the Philippines. It is also a concern of the U.S. and other democratic countries in the world."

In July 1999, Rohrabacher led the House floor in opposition to legislation normalizing trade ties between the United States and China. The following year, as the House weighed another China trade bill, Rohrabacher said the trade bill was a giveaway to a select number of American billionaires and the Beijing regime, adding that President Bill Clinton could call "communist China 'our strategic partner' until his face turns blue, but it won't make them any less red."

In 2011 interviews, Rohrabacher described the Chinese government under the leadership of Hu Jintao as "a gangster regime that murders its own people" and described the Chinese government as Nazis.

In December 2016, after President-elect Trump had a phone call with President of Taiwan Tsai Ing-wen, Rohrabacher said the call had "showed the dictators in Beijing that he's not a pushover" and that China "has had an enormously aggressive foreign policy".

Organ harvesting in China

In 2012 Rohrabacher stated,

and

Iraq War
Rohrabacher voted in support of the Authorization for the Use of Military Force Against Iraq in 2002, a position that he later said was "a mistake".

Iran
In August 2012, Rohrabacher noted on his official website that he had written a letter addressed to the U.S. State Department, noting his support of U.S. sponsorship of separatist movements in Iran. This elicited criticism from the Iranian-American community, which included challenging Rohrabacher's understanding of the historical background alluded to in his letter to the Department of State.

In June 2017, a day after an ISIL attack in Tehran, during a House Foreign Affairs Committee hearing, Rohrabacher stated: "Isn't it a good thing for us to have the United States finally backing up Sunnis who will attack Hezbollah and the Shiite threat to us, isn't that a good thing?" This comment was strongly criticized by the National Iranian American Council, which wrote, "Rohrabacher has a long history of bizarre and offensive statements on Iran, but his callousness toward the Iranian victims of ISIS terror might be his most callous and extreme thus far."

Rohrabacher supported removing the People's Mujahedin of Iran (MEK) from the United States State Department list of Foreign Terrorist Organizations; it was included on the list from 1997 to 2012. Rohrabacher received $10,300 in donations from the MEK between 2013 and 2015.

Aid to Pakistan
In May 2011, in the wake of Osama Bin Laden's death, Rohrabacher introduced a bill to stop aid to Pakistan, stating that members of the government and of Pakistan's security force, the ISI, were either sheltering Bin Laden or completely incompetent. "We can no longer afford this foolishness. ... The time has come for us to stop subsidizing those who actively oppose us. Pakistan has shown itself not to be America's ally." Rohrabacher also demanded the return of the US helicopter that crashed in the operation to kill Bin Laden, stating "If this is not done immediately, it is probable, given Pakistan's history, that our technology has already found its way into the hands of the Communist Chinese military that is buying, building, and stealing the necessary military technology to challenge the United States."

In June 2017, while speaking to Assistant Secretary of State for Political-Military Affairs Tina Kaidanow, Rohrabacher said, "We need to go on the record here, in this part of our government, to say that we're not going to be providing weapons systems to Pakistan that we're afraid are going to shoot down our own people. And we know they're engaged in terrorism."

Support for Mohiuddin Ahmed
In 2007, Rohrabacher supported Mohiuddin Ahmed, a detainee in the U.S., who was said to be involved in an attempted coup in Bangladesh, during which several people were murdered. He was convicted of the assassination of Sheikh Mujibur Rahman, the first President of Bangladesh. Bangladesh's extradition request was halted as Rohrabacher voiced concern about his legal rights, saying that he should be sent somewhere with no death penalty. His support was applauded by both Amnesty International and the U.S. Conference of Catholic Bishops. Mohiuddin Ahmed was found guilty of being a participant in the assassinations and was executed on January 28, 2010.

Taiwan

After President-elect Donald Trump answered a congratulatory phone call from democratically elected President of Taiwan Tsai Ing-wen on December 2, 2016, Rohrabacher said Trump's phone call with Taiwan's president was "terrific" because of the diplomatic warning it sent to China. "He showed the dictators in Beijing that he's not a pushover." He emphasized, "China has had an enormously aggressive foreign policy and by him actually going to Taiwan, he's showing the people in Beijing that they cannot have this aggressive foreign policy and expect to be treated just the same by an American president."

Ukraine
Rohrabacher gave a "qualified defense" of the annexation of Crimea by Russia in 2014. On March 6, 2014, he was one of 23 members of the House of Representatives to vote against a $1 billion loan guarantee to support the new government of Ukraine. In the March 11, 2014, House of Representatives vote (402 voting yes; 7 opposed) to condemn Russia for violating Ukraine's sovereignty, Rohrabacher voted "present". Commenting on the issue, he stated, "Starting with our own American Revolution, groups of people have declared themselves, rightfully, to be under a different government or a government of their choosing. People forget that's what our Declaration of Independence is all about." He also said, "The sanctions are an abomination of hypocrisy. This is ridiculous: What we were doing with the violence and military action we took to secure the Kosovars' right to self-determination was far more destructive and had far more loss of life than what Putin's done trying to ensure the people of Crimea are not cut off from what they would choose as their destiny with Russia."

Uzbekistan
During a US Congressional delegation's visit to Uzbekistan in February 2013, Rohrabacher made several controversial statements. The chief among those statements was that the United States should treat Uzbekistan like Saudi Arabia by disregarding the former's human rights abuses in achieving America's national interests, particularly in selling armaments and drones to Uzbekistan.

North Macedonia
In 2017, in an interview for an Albanian TV channel Vizion Plus Rohrabacher suggested that Macedonia "is not a country" and that the "Kosovars and Albanians from Macedonia should be part of Kosovo and the rest of Macedonia should be part of Bulgaria or any other country to which they believe they are related", which provoked a response from the Macedonian foreign ministry which accused him of inflaming "nationalistic rhetoric".

Turkey 
In the wake of the clashes at the Turkish Ambassador's Residence in May 2017, Rohrabacher called Donald Trump to never invite Turkish President Recep Tayyip Erdoğan again to the United States, and to bar Americans from purchasing Turkish government debt.

Eritrea 
In August 2017, Rohrabacher proposed amending the Department of Defense budget whereby the United States would establish military ties with Eritrea. Rohrabacher suggested that the two countries should cooperate in fighting the War on Terror, curbing Iranian influence in the Yemeni Civil War, and securing the Red Sea region. At the time of Rohrabacher's proposal, Eritrea was subject to international sanctions due to its alleged support of Al-Shabaab in Somalia, and to U.S. sanctions against the Eritrean Navy following an alleged shipment of North Korean military hardware to Eritrea.

Julian Assange 
In August 2017, Rohrabacher attended a meeting in London with Julian Assange organized and attended by right-wing political activist Charles C. Johnson. Rohrabacher said that the discussion was about the possibility of a presidential pardon in exchange for Assange supplying information on the theft of emails from the Democratic National Committee, which were published by WikiLeaks before the 2016 presidential election. In October 2017, Rohrabacher and Johnson met with Senator Rand Paul (R-Kentucky) to discuss Assange supplying information about the source of leaked emails. However, Assange responded to news accounts of the meeting, tweeting, "WikiLeaks never has and never will reveal a source. Offers have been made to me—not the other way around. I do not speak to the public through third parties."

Other foreign policy

In March 2005, Rohrabacher introduced HR 1061, the American Property Claims Against Ethiopia Act, which would "prohibit United States assistance to the Federal Democratic Republic of Ethiopia until the Ethiopian government returns all property of United States citizens". The bill was introduced by Rohrabacher at the behest of Gebremedhin Berhane, a former Eritrean national and friend of the Rohrabacher family, after his business was expropriated by the Ethiopian government.

On March 7, 2006, Rohrabacher introduced HR 4895, an amendment to the Foreign Assistance Act of 1961, "to limit the provision of the United States military assistance and the sale, transfer, or licensing of United States military equipment or technology to Ethiopia".

During an appearance on MSNBC's The Ed Show, Rohrabacher accused Barack Obama of allowing violence in Iran to get out of hand because he did not speak forcefully enough against the country's leadership. He also said that Gorbachev tore down the Berlin Wall because Reagan told him to ("Tear down this wall").

In early 2010, he went to Honduras to commend the election of the new president. His entourage included a group of Californian property investors and businessmen, a dealer in rare coins, and CEOs from San Diego biofuels corporation (which is headed by a family friend).

Domestic political positions

Rohrabacher voted to repeal Obamacare, disputed evidence of man-made global warming, was a staunch opponent of illegal immigration, and favored the legalization of cannabis. In foreign policy, he supported withdrawing U.S. troops from Afghanistan, called for Trump to punish Turkish President Erdoğan on embassy violence, sided with Russia in the Russia–Georgia war, gave a qualified defense of the annexation of Crimea in 2014.

Rohrabacher was warned in 2012 in a secure room at the Capitol building by an agent from the FBI that Russian spies may have been trying to recruit him to act on Russia's behalf as an "agent of influence", after he met with a member of the Russian foreign ministry privately in Moscow. Following the ISIS terrorist attacks in Tehran on June 7, 2017, in which 17 innocent civilians were killed, he suggested that the attack could be viewed as 'a good thing', and surmised that President Trump might have been behind the coordination of this terrorist attack. An article in The Atlantic suggested that there was serious concern in the State Department of ties between Rohrabacher and the Russian government.

On November 21, 2017, The New York Times reported that Rohrabacher had come under scrutiny from special counsel Robert Mueller and the Senate Intelligence Committee for his close ties to the Kremlin.

Rohrabacher had drawn public criticism for some of his positions. His controversial statements included the conspiracy theory claims, first promoted by the politically-biased conspiracy theory website Infowars, that Democrats secretly organized the Unite the Right Rally in Charlottesville to provoke the violence by the alt-right (which led to the murder of one anti-Nazi protester) in order to discredit President Trump. Rohrabacher had also consistently supported Russian interests in Congress and had defended Trump's controversial remarks regarding Russia.

He had been a staunch supporter of President Donald Trump.

Firearms
In 2018 Sacha Baron Cohen's television program Who Is America? premiered showing Rohrabacher supporting the hoax "kinderguardians program" which supported training toddlers with firearms. Rohrabacher claims that he never spoke to Cohen, that he was taken out of context, and that he spoke, "broadly of making sure young people could get training in self-defense".

Global warming
Rohrabacher doubts the scientific consensus that global warming is caused by humans. During a congressional hearing on climate change on February 8, 2007, Rohrabacher mused that previous warming cycles may have been caused by carbon dioxide released into the atmosphere by "dinosaur flatulence": Politico and The New York Times reported that on May 25, 2011, Rohrabacher expressed further skepticism regarding the existence of man-made global warming and suggested that, if global warming is an issue, a possible solution could be clear-cutting rain forests, and replanting. These reports sparked strong criticism by some scientists, including Oliver Phillips, a geography professor at the University of Leeds. They noted the consensus that intact forests act as net absorbers of carbon, reducing global warming.

Rohrabacher does not believe that global warming is a problem. At a town hall meeting with the Newport Mesa Tea Party in August 2013, Rohrabacher said "global warming is a total fraud" and part of a "game plan" by liberals to "create global government".

Healthcare
On May 4, 2017, Rohrabacher voted in favor of repealing the Patient Protection and Affordable Care Act (Obamacare) and passing the American Health Care Act. During his 2018 re-election campaign, Rohrabacher pledged to protect protections for individuals with preexisting conditions. Rohrabacher voted for his party's Obamacare replacement bill that included state waivers from rules that prohibit charging higher prices to people with pre-existing conditions.

Immigration
Rohrabacher was an advocate for the state of California's Proposition 187, which prohibited illegal immigrants from acquiring government services. In 2004, he sponsored an amendment that would have prohibited federal reimbursement of hospital-provided emergency care and certain transportation services to undocumented aliens unless the hospital provided information about the aliens' citizenship, immigration status, financial data, and employer to the Secretary of Homeland Security. Aliens who were in the country illegally would receive reimbursement only after they were deported. The proposed bill was defeated, 331–88.

In 2005, Rohrabacher opined that the Republican Party was split on the issue of immigration: "There are those of us who identify with the national wing and patriotic wing of the party who have always been adamant on the illegal immigration issues. And, on the other side, you have those people who believe in the business and global marketplace concept. So, you have a party with two different views on one of the major issues of the day."

In early 2008, Rohrabacher endorsed Mitt Romney in the Republican presidential primary, citing his positions on stemming illegal immigration and criticizing John McCain. About McCain, he said: "He's been the enemy of those of us who have stemmed the flow of illegals into our country, whereas Romney has made some very tough commitments."

In 2011, Rohrabacher proposed the bill H.R. 787 known as the "No Social Security for Illegal Immigrants Act of 2011". The bill: "Amends title II of the Social Security Act to exclude from creditable wages and self-employment income any wages earned for services by aliens performed in the United States, and self-employment income derived from a trade or business conducted in the United States, while the alien was not authorized to be so employed or to perform a function or service in such a trade or business."

In 2013, an 18-year-old student visited Rohrabacher's office to discuss immigration reform. At some point their conversation became disagreeable, and the student said the congressman yelled at her: "I hate illegals!" He also allegedly threatened to deport her family. Rohrabacher's spokesperson has disputed both statements, averring that it was actually the student who started the confrontation by yelling at the spokesperson and telling her to "butt out".

In September 2017, Rohrabacher supported the Trump administration's rescinding of the Deferred Action for Childhood Arrivals program, saying that those "in Congress must work to prevent such cynical loopholes from being created again by executive fiat" despite their possible empathy for the immigrants.

The organization NumbersUSA has given Rep. Rohrabacher an A+ rating in accordance to his stance on illegal immigration.

LGBT issues
Rohrabacher has drawn controversy over his views on LGBT rights. He opposed same-sex marriage and endorsed Proposition 8, the ballot initiative in 2008 that would have prohibited same-sex marriage in California, during a debate at Orange Coast College, stating he "would suggest not changing the definition of marriage in our society to make a small number of people feel more comfortable".

Rohrabacher voted in favor of the Federal Marriage Amendment in both 2004 and 2006, a proposed amendment to the U.S. Constitution that would have defined marriage as between a man and a woman and forbade states from recognizing or legalizing same-sex marriage. After the Supreme Court issued its decision in Hollingsworth v. Perry in 2013, that legalized same-sex marriage in California, Rohrabacher criticized the decision, stating that the decision was "not based on the merits of the issue but on a technicality". However, Rohrabacher has appeared to have endorsed the idea of leaving marriage to religious institutions only, stating on Twitter that churches should be solely responsible for conducting marriages but that the government should only recognize them.

In May 2018, Rohrabacher provoked severe criticism after telling a meeting of the Orange County Association of Realtors that homeowners "should be able to make a decision not to sell their home to someone (if) they don't agree with their lifestyle." Though the statement did not explicitly refer to LGBT people, it was widely interpreted as such. LGBT groups denounced Rohrabacher for the remarks, and the National Association of Realtors, which had previously donated to Rohrabacher's re-election campaigns, condemned Rohrabacher, halted all of its financial support for him and repudiated its past donations to him. After Rohrabacher's constituents unseated him in favor of Harley Rouda, The Advocate praised the results and condemned Rohrabacher.

Despite criticism from the LGBT community later in his career, early in his political career, Rohrabacher supported a proposal by gays to move to a rural California county and take leadership roles. Rohrabacher's "California Libertarian Alliance endorsed the project. 'Your main resources are the freedom you offer plus the environment you are locating in,' Dana Rohrabacher, one of the libertarian group’s founders and later speechwriter to then-President Reagan, wrote in a letter to GLF. 'The economic goods are perfect for some kind of a combination ski gambling resort.'"

Cannabis

Rohrabacher supported the legalization of cannabis for both medical and recreational purposes. He spoke against the policy of cannabis prohibition as early as May 2013, calling it a "colossal failure" in an op-ed penned for the Orange County Register. He further outlined his views in a May 2014 op-ed in National Review, arguing that the prohibition of cannabis has incurred a number of undesirable costs upon free society, such as an increase in gang violence, soaring incarceration rates, unconstitutional seizure of private property through civil forfeiture, corruption and militarization of police forces, and negative impacts on minority communities and relationships with Latin-American countries. Rohrabacher has called on fellow Republicans to reconsider their stance towards cannabis, citing core conservative principles such as limited government, individual liberty, respect for the Tenth Amendment, and respect for the doctor–patient relationship that Rohrabacher says lend support to loosening current laws. He also notes conservative leaders such as Milton Friedman, William F. Buckley, and Grover Norquist that have espoused similar drug policy views. In April 2016, Rohrabacher announced his endorsement of California's Proposition 64, the Adult Use of Marijuana Act.

Rohrabacher is a strong proponent of states' rights when it comes to cannabis policy. He has introduced the Rohrabacher–Farr amendment for a number of years beginning in 2003, to prohibit the Justice Department from spending funds to interfere with the implementation of state medical cannabis laws. The amendment passed the House for the first time in May 2014, becoming law in December 2014 as part of an omnibus spending bill. Additional legislation that Rohrabacher has introduced includes the Respect State Marijuana Laws Act and the Veterans Equal Access Act. Rohrabacher has called on the DEA / DOJ to remove cannabis from the list of Schedule I drugs. In February 2017, Rohrabacher co-founded the Congressional Cannabis Caucus – along with Reps. Don Young (R–AK), Jared Polis (D–CO), and Earl Blumenauer (D–OR) – to help advance policy change regarding cannabis at the federal level. Rohrabacher earned an "A+" rating from NORML for his voting record regarding cannabis-related matters.

Patent reform
Rohrabacher was an opponent of the America Invents Act, a bill that is attempting to change the current Patent System. Rohrabacher opposes changing from a "first to invent system" to a "first to file system" saying it "hurts the little guy". Rohrabacher commented: "Make no mistake, 'first to file' weakens patent protection. It is likely to make vulnerable individual and small inventors, who don't have an army of lawyers on retainer. These 'little guys' have been the lifeblood of American progress and competitiveness for more than 200 years. Our system was designed to protect individual rights, and it has worked for all – not just the corporate elite." Rohrabacher went on to comment in a Politico op-ed: "We're told this is necessary to harmonize with Japanese and European patent law. But those systems were established by elitists and economic shoguns interested in corporate power, not individual rights."

Space
Rohrabacher was chairman of the Subcommittee on Space and Aeronautics from 1997 to January 2005 and has been active on space-related issues. In 2000, Space.com described Rohrabacher as "a strident advocate for supremacy in space, a philosophy shaped along a winding road from libertarian activist to White House speech writer in the Reagan administration". In 2007, Rohrabacher introduced a bill that would direct NASA to develop a strategy "for deflecting and mitigating potentially hazardous near-Earth objects". Rohrabacher has applauded the Apollo astronauts, calling them unofficial ambassadors. Rohrabacher stated "I applaud their efforts and accomplishments over the past fifty years. And I encourage all Americans to join with me in thanking them for their accomplishments and for the international role they have played in serving as unofficial Ambassadors to the world on our behalf."

On July 18, 2017, Rohrabacher asked a panel of space experts testifying before the House Committee on Science, Space, and Technology if civilizations could have existed on Mars in the past. Kenneth Farley, a project scientist on NASA's Mars Rover 2020 Project, said: "I would say that is extremely unlikely."

Tax reform
Rohrabacher voted against the Tax Cuts and Jobs Act of 2017. Despite efforts made by Republicans to change the bill to be more generous regarding cap deductions on new home mortgages, Rohrabacher remained staunch at voting nay on the bill, as the more than half of the new mortgages in his district are above the $750,000 cap. He stated on his Facebook page that "Due to the pressure of several members like me, the bill was improved, but not enough for my constituents."

2020 presidential election

After leaving office, Rohrabacher participated in "Stop the Steal" rallies in support of Donald Trump. On January 6, 2021, Rohrabacher was filmed breaching a United States Capitol Police barricade during the January 6 United States Capitol attack, although Rohrabacher was not charged with an offense.

Personal life

Rohrabacher has been married to his wife, Rhonda Carmony, since 1997. In 2004, they became parents of triplets.

Rohrabacher was described by the Los Angeles Times as "an avid surfer". He also sings, plays guitar, and has written his own song about freedom and America.

Rohrabacher revealed in May 2016 that he uses a cannabis-infused topical rub to treat his arthritis pain, allowing him to sleep through the night. The product is legal under California state law but remains a banned substance under U.S. federal law.

In December 2018, a month after losing his bid for reelection, Rohrabacher announced that he would be moving to Maine to, among other things, write film scripts. In May 2019 he announced his appointment to the advisory board of BudTrader.com, a company that provides cannabis-related advertising services.

Rohrabacher is Protestant.

Electoral history

See also
 List of federal political scandals in the United States
 Timeline of Russian interference in the 2016 United States elections

References

External links

 
 
 
 Planetary Defense, Baltimore Chronicle, March 15, 2007

|-

|-

|-

|-

1947 births
Protesters in or near the January 6 United States Capitol attack
20th-century American politicians
21st-century American politicians
American Protestants
Businesspeople in the cannabis industry
California State University, Long Beach alumni
Christians from California
Christians from Maine
Living people
People from Coronado, California
People from Costa Mesa, California
Politicians from San Diego
Reagan administration personnel
Republican Party members of the United States House of Representatives from California
Right-wing populism in the United States
Tea Party movement activists
University of Southern California alumni
American libertarians